The 2009 President's Cup was a professional tennis tournament played on indoor hard courts. It was the fourth edition of the tournament which was part of the 2009 ATP Challenger Tour. It took place in Astana, Kazakhstan between 2 and 8 November 2009.

ATP entrants

Seeds

 Rankings are as of October 26, 2009.

Other entrants
The following players received wildcards into the singles main draw:
  Syrym Abdulkhalikov
  Danjil Braun
  Andrey Kuznetsov
  Alexey Nesterov

The following players received entry from the qualifying draw:
  Ilya Belyaev
  Evgeny Donskoy
  Konstantin Kravchuk
  Andrey Kumantsov

Champions

Singles

 Andrey Golubev def.  Illya Marchenko, 6–3, 6–3

Doubles

 Jonathan Marray /  Jamie Murray def.  David Martin /  Rogier Wassen, 4–6, 6–3, [10–5]

External links
ITF Search 
2009 Draws

President's Cup
President's Cup (tennis)